Chicoreus miyokoae, common name : the Miyoko Murex, is a species of sea snail, a marine gastropod mollusk in the family Muricidae, the murex snails or rock snails.

Description
The size of an adult shell varies between 45 mm and 78 mm.

Distribution
This marine species is found off the Philippines.

References

 Kosuge S. (1979) Descriptions of two new species of the family Muricidae (Gastropoda), Mollusca). Bulletin of the Institute of Malacology, Tokyo 1(1): 1–2, pl. 1
 Merle D., Garrigues B. & Pointier J.-P. (2011) Fossil and Recent Muricidae of the world. Part Muricinae. Hackenheim: Conchbooks. 648 pp. page(s): 133

External links
 

Muricidae
Gastropods described in 1979